Aretas Akers-Douglas, 2nd Viscount Chilston,  (17 February 1876 – 25 July 1947), was a British diplomat. He was Ambassador to the Soviet Union between 1933 and 1938.

Background and education
Chilston was born in London, the son of Aretas Akers-Douglas, 1st Viscount Chilston, and Adeline Mary, daughter of Horatio Austen-Smith. He was educated at Eton.

Diplomatic career
Akers-Douglas entered the Diplomatic Service in 1898, and was appointed a Third Secretary in December 1900.
He was an officer in the 3rd (Militia) Battalion of The Royal Scots (Lothian Regiment), where he was appointed captain on 15 April 1899. He was seconded for service in Egypt on 14 March 1900.

He held minor positions before being appointed Ambassador to Austria in 1921, a post he held until 1928. He then served as Ambassador to Hungary between 1928 and 1933 and as Ambassador to the Soviet Union between 1933 and 1938. He was appointed a CMG in 1918, a KCMG in 1927 and a GCMG in 1935 and was sworn of the Privy Council in 1939.

Family
Lord Chilston married Amy, daughter of Major John Robert Jennings-Bramly, in 1903. They had two sons, of whom the eldest, the Hon. Aretas, was killed in a motor accident in 1940. Lord Chilston died in July 1947, aged 71, and was succeeded in the viscountcy by his second and only surviving son, Eric. Lady Chilston died in August 1962.

References

External links

1876 births
1947 deaths
People educated at Eton College
Viscounts in the Peerage of the United Kingdom
Knights Grand Cross of the Order of St Michael and St George
Ambassadors of the United Kingdom to Austria
Ambassadors of the United Kingdom to the Soviet Union
Ambassadors of the United Kingdom to Hungary
Members of the Privy Council of the United Kingdom